Providence Hall is an K-12 charter school located in Herriman, Utah.

Providence Hall was originally planned to be location in neighboring city Bluffdale, but relocated to Herriman in late 2007.

It is entirely certified to be an International Baccalaureate school, with all programs from Primary Years Program (PYP), Middle Years Program (MYP), and Diploma Program (DP). Students are admitted through a lottery.

Elementary School 
Providence Hall Elementary School goes grades K-5. They have an emphasis on "inquiry-based, authentic, and hands-on learning". The framework for the curriculum is an Elementary Primary Years Programme. The principal is Michael Fry. An expansion started in the summer of 2022 to add classroom space and a full-sized gym.

Junior High 
The junior high goes grades 6th through 8th. They operate on an A/B schedule. The principal is Awbree Summers. Band, orchesta, and choir are also offered.

Sports offered:

 Cross Country (Co-Ed)
 Girls Volleyball
 Boys Basketball
 Girls Basketball
 Boys Soccer
 Girls Soccer

High School 
The high school goes grades 9th through 12th. fifteen Advanced Placement (AP) and twelve Concurrent Enrollment (CE) courses are offered. Thirty-nine percent of recent graduates earned a cumulative GPA of 3.5 or better, and sixty-one percent earned either an Advanced or Advanced Honors Diploma. The class of 2021 earned over 2.7 million dollars in scholarship money and were accepted to more than 50 different colleges and universities including Stanford, Dartmouth, and Cornell. The school has multiple clubs and organizations including National Honors Society, Naval JROTC, speech and debate, dance, cheer, and choir. The principal is Melissa McPhail.

Sports offered:

 Football
 Golf
 Volleyball
 Corss Country
 Tennis
 Soccer
 Basketball
 Wrestling
 Softball

References

External links
 School website

Public elementary schools in Utah
Schools in Salt Lake County, Utah
Charter schools in Utah